The 2015 Dover District Council election took place on 7 May 2015 to elect members of the Dover District Council in Kent, England. It was held on the same day as other local elections. The Conservative Party retained overall control of the council.

References

2015 English local elections
May 2015 events in the United Kingdom
2015
2010s in Kent